Muhammad Faizan (born 7 May 1997) is a Pakistani cricketer. In December 2019, he was drafted by the Pakistan Super League (PSL) franchise team Lahore Qalandars as their Emerging category Player during the 2020 PSL draft. He made his Twenty20 debut for the Lahore Qalandars against Marylebone Cricket Club (MCC) on 14 February 2020, during the MCC's tour of Pakistan. He made his List A debut on 22 March 2022, for Central Punjab in the 2021–22 Pakistan Cup.

References

External links
 

Living people
Pakistani cricketers
Lahore Qalandars cricketers
1997 births